The Oregon Trail is a 1923 American silent Western film serial directed by Edward Laemmle. The film is considered to be lost.

Cast
 Art Acord as Jean Brulet
 Louise Lorraine as Rosita Velázquez
 Duke R. Lee as Dr. Marcus Whitman
 Jim Corey as Rene Coulier
 Burton Law as Rev. Henry Spaulding (as Burton C. Law)
 Sidney De Gray as Hernandez Velázquez
 Ruth Royce as Narcissa Prentiss
 Grace McLean as Mrs. Spaulding
 Dick Carter as Dr. William Gray
 Walter Bytell
 William Ryno (as William H. Ryno)
 Frederick Peters
 Rex the Dog as Jerry (the dog) (as Rex the Wonder Dog)
 Fleetwood the Horse as Fleetwood (Jean's horse)
 Hank Bell as Trapper (uncredited)

Chapter titles
 Westward Ho!
 White Treachery
 Across the Continent
 Message of Death
 Wagon of Doom
 Secret Foes
 A Man of God
 Seeds of Civilization
 Justice
 The New Era
 A Game of Nations
 To Save an Empire
 Trail of Death
 On to Washington
 Santa Fe
 Fate of a Nation
 For High Stakes
 Victory

See also
 List of film serials
 List of film serials by studio
 List of lost films

References

External links
 

1923 films
1923 lost films
1923 Western (genre) films
American silent serial films
American black-and-white films
Films directed by Edward Laemmle
Lost Western (genre) films
Lost American films
Silent American Western (genre) films
Universal Pictures film serials
1920s American films